In enzymology, an aryl-acylamidase is an enzyme that catalyzes the chemical reaction

an anilide + H2O  a carboxylate + aniline

Thus, the two substrates of this enzyme are anilide and H2O, whereas its two products are carboxylate and aniline.

This enzyme belongs to the family of hydrolases, those acting on carbon-nitrogen bonds other than peptide bonds, specifically in linear amides.  The systematic name of this enzyme class is aryl-acylamide amidohydrolase. Other names in common use include AAA-1, AAA-2, brain acetylcholinesterase (is associated with AAA-2), and pseudocholinesterase (associated with arylacylamidase).

References 

 

EC 3.5.1
Enzymes of unknown structure